ScotRail Trains Limited, trading as ScotRail, is a Scottish train operating company that is publicly owned by Scottish Rail Holdings on behalf of the Scottish Government. It has been operating the ScotRail franchise as an operator of last resort since 1 April 2022.

History
The ScotRail network had since 2015 been operated by the private-sector franchisee Abellio ScotRail. In December 2019, Transport Scotland announced Abellio had not met the performance criteria necessary to have its seven-year franchise extended for a further three years, and the franchise would conclude on 31 March 2022.

In March 2021, Transport Scotland announced that the franchise would not be re-tendered for another private-sector operator to run, but would be operated by an operator of last resort owned by the Scottish Government.
The move was welcomed by the ASLEF, RMT and TSSA unions.

The Minister for Transport, Jenny Gilruth, confirmed in February 2022 that ScotRail services would return to public ownership. She invited key stakeholders to take part in a discussion on the future of the service, saying "I can confirm that the transition of ScotRail into Scottish Government control will take place on 1 April 2022. Whilst that’s good news, it’s clear that much work still needs to be done... I want to kick-start a National Conversation about what our new beginning for ScotRail should look like - an affordable, sustainable, customer focused rail passenger  service in Scotland in a post pandemic world."

The Scottish Conservatives Transport Spokesman, Graham Simpson, criticised the planned consultation, saying that it "should be about lower fares, restoring services and stopping cuts to ticket offices - measures that will encourage people to use public transport." The Scottish Liberal Democrats added that discussions should have started two years earlier, when nationalisation was decided.

On 4 April 2022, on-board catering started to be reintroduced on ScotRail services. It had been suspended during the COVID-19 pandemic.

In May 2022, ASLEF balloted its members for strike action, with drivers refusing to work overtime. In May 2022, many Sunday services were cancelled due to driver shortages. ScotRail stated that the COVID-19 pandemic had prevented them from training an estimated 130 drivers. On 1 June 2022, ASLEF announced that it had rejected an improved pay offer from ScotRail.

A temporary timetable was brought in on 23 May 2022. The number of daily services was cut by around one-third, from approximately 2,150 to 1,456. Many early morning and late night services were cancelled. In June 2022, ASLEF recommended its members accept a revised offer. Services between Wick and Inverness on the Far North Line were cut from four trains each way per day to two. Stagecoach Highlands are expected to introduce an additional bus service on the route starting 6 June 2022.

Services
ScotRail Trains took over all of the services operated by Abellio. As of December 2022, off-peak services delivered by ScotRail Monday to Friday are as follows:

Central Belt

Scotland National

Fleet
ScotRail operates a number of different electric and diesel train types in its fleet.

In 2021, ScotRail introduced five newly refurbished Class 153 carriages, which are attached to two-car Class 156 units. These new carriages, named "Highland Explorer" feature a 50:50 split between seating and bicycle racks.
The new carriage, which carries a £10 supplement to the regular ticket price, includes complimentary refreshments, cycling themed interior decorations and external vinyl wrap, and maps for cyclists planning to explore Western Scotland by bicycle.

Electrification 
Transport Scotland has a plan to implement the Scottish Government's policy to "decarbonise domestic passenger rail services", part of which involves replacing all diesel trains by 2035. The £55 million first phase, to electrify  of Fife Circle track, between Haymarket and Dalmeny, for use by battery electric multiple units, was begun by Scottish Powerlines in June 2022 and is due to be completed by December 2024. Further phases will electrify the lines between Kinghorn, Thornton, Ladybank and Lochgelly.

Stations 
ScotRail operates 353 stations in Scotland. Not included are Prestwick International Airport station, owned and operated by the airport, as well as both Edinburgh Waverley and Glasgow Central, which are managed by Network Rail. ScotRail operates Lockerbie and  even though no ScotRail services currently call at either station.

Depots 
ScotRail's fleet is maintained at Edinburgh Haymarket, Glasgow Eastfield, Glasgow Shields Road, Corkerhill Glasgow, Yoker, Ayr Townhead, Bathgate and Inverness as well as a newly built EMU stabling depot at Millerhill in Midlothian and a rebuilt depot at Cadder Yard.

References

External links

Operators of last resort
Public corporations of the Scottish Government
Railway companies established in 2022
Railway companies of Scotland
2022 establishments in Scotland